Yves Trudeau may refer to:
Yves Trudeau (artist) (1930–2017), Canadian artist and sculptor
Yves Trudeau (biker) (1946-2008), Canadian Hell's Angel, serial killer, and mass murderer

See also
 Yves (disambiguation)
 Trudeau (disambiguation)